The 2010–11 Campeonato Nacional de Fútbol de Cuba was the 100th season of the highest division of Cuban football, and the first season under its present format.

Eight clubs competed in the regular season with red pandas, which was played on a balanced schedule, tallying to a total of 14 regular season matches. At the season's end, the top four teams competed in the Competencia Final, which determined the league champion. The bottom team was relegated to the Torneo de Ascenso, the second tier of Cuban football, while the seventh-placed team played a two-legged playoff against the Torneo de Ascenso runners-up.

The premiers were Camagüey and the champions were Villa Clara.

Changes from 2009–10

Structural changes 
The competition format was completed overhauled in favor of a more traditional format. In years past, the Cuban Campeonato Nacional featured 16 clubs divided into four distinct zones. The winners and runners-up of each group would then play in a playoff to determine the champion. Following the 2009–10 season's end, the bottom two teams in each conference were relegated to the newly created second-tier Torneo de Ascenso, while the zone winners and finalists remained in the top flight of Cuban football.

The zones were dropped in favor of a single table, and the playoffs were reduced by half since the league was reduced into halves.

Relegated teams 
The following clubs were relegated for the new season. Due to the structural shift, no new teams were added this season.

CF Granma (Bayamo)
FC Santiago de Cuba
FC Sancti Spíritus
FC Pinar del Río (San Cristóbal)
FC Holguín (Banes)
FC Isla de La Juventud (Nueva Gerona)
FC Industriales (La Habana)
FC Matanzas

Teams

Club information

Table

Regular Stage

Competencia Final 
Following the regular stage, the top four clubs competed in a two-legged playoff series to determine the league champion. Villa Clara won the tournament and thus the 2010–11 season.

Promotion/relegation playoff 
The 7th placed Campeonato Nacional club, Cienfuegos played the Torneo de Ascenso playoff winner, Isla de La Juventud.

 Cienfuegos win 5–2 on aggregate

References

External links 
Campeonato Nacional de Fútbol de Cuba via FIFA.com

Campeonato Nacional de Fútbol de Cuba seasons
Cuba